Anders Niclas Lewicki (born 7 January 1967) is a Swedish former footballer who played as a forward. He played two Allsvenskan matches for Malmö FF in 1987.

He is the father of professional footballer Oscar Lewicki.

References 

Living people
Association football forwards
Swedish footballers
Swedish people of Polish descent
Allsvenskan players
Malmö FF players
1967 births